Lebleu, leBleu, Le-Bleu, le Bleu, or variation, may refer to:

Places 
 LeBleu Settlement, Louisiana, USA

People 
 Conway LeBleu (1918–2007), Louisiana politician
 Dave Lebleu (drummer), U.S. musician

Other uses 
 Le Bleu (2001 album), a 2001 album by Justin King

See also
 Bleu (disambiguation)
 Les Bleus (disambiguation)